Lighthouse Inn may refer to:

Lighthouse Inn (New London, Connecticut), listed on the NRHP in New London County, Connecticut
Lighthouse Inn (West Dennis, Massachusetts), also known as West Dennis Lighthouse